Jalalabad suicide bombing may refer to:

 2015 Jalalabad suicide bombing
 2016 Jalalabad suicide bombing
 2018 Save the Children Jalalabad attack
 July 2018 Jalalabad suicide bombing
 2019 Jalalabad suicide bombing